Andrea Stella (born 22 February 1971) is an Italian engineer, currently the Team Principal of McLaren F1 Team. He was previously Performance Engineer and Race Engineer at Scuderia Ferrari.

Education 
He graduated in aerospace engineering at La Sapienza University in Rome. In 2000, he completed a PhD in Mechanical Engineering with an experimental study on fluid dynamics of flames.

Formula One career

Scuderia Ferrari 
He began his career at Ferrari in 2000 as Performance Engineer for the test team, before being Performance Engineer for Michael Schumacher (2002–2006) then Kimi Räikkönen (2007–2008). He moved to become Race Engineer for Räikkönen (2009), before becoming Race Engineer for Fernando Alonso (2010–2014). In 2006, he also worked as track engineer with Valentino Rossi, when the motorcyclist had a test with Ferrari.

McLaren Racing 
He joined McLaren in 2015 as Head of Race Operations, moving to Performance Director in 2018 and Racing Director in 2019. In the latter role, he formed a triumvirate with James Key as Technical Director and Piers Thynne as Production Director, all under Team Principal Andreas Seidl.

On 13 December 2022, he was announced to replace Seidl as Team Principal of McLaren, ahead of the 2023 season.

References 

McLaren people
Ferrari people
Formula One team principals
Formula One engineers
1971 births
Sapienza University of Rome alumni
Italian engineers
Living people